The burning of the Ottoman flagship off Chios took place on the night of 18 June 1822. The event, occurring during the Greek War of Independence, was a reprisal for the Chios massacre which occurred two months earlier. Two thousand Ottoman sailors were killed, as was Nasuhzade Ali Pasha, the Kapudan Pasha of the Ottoman Navy.

The event 
In March 1821, the Greek War of Independence began against the Ottoman Empire. One year later, the Ottoman forces disembarked on the island of Chios, massacred more than  Greek inhabitants, and captured about  who were sold as slaves in Izmir and Istanbul.

After the Chios massacre, the Greek revolutionary government managed to gather a significant amount of money ( kuruş) in order to outfit its ships and attack the armada. In May 1821, the Greek navy made consecutive attacks against the Ottoman fleet.

At the end of May, the Greek captains from Psara and Hydra decided to burn the Ottoman flagship by using fire ships. Konstantinos Kanaris and Andreas Pipinos took charge of the operation. The first would blow up the Ottoman flagship with his fireboat and the second the vice admiral's flagship. The two fireboats would be accompanied by four ships that would gather the sailors of the fireboats after the completion of the operation.

Andreas Pipinos tried to burn the rear admiral's flagship, but although some damage was caused, it did not sink, as the crew realized the danger quickly and saw off the fireboat. However, Kanaris managed to affix his fireship firmly to the flagship, the 84-gun ship of the line Mansur al-liwa. The fire spread to the Ottoman ship and eventually reached the gunpowder hold, resulting in an explosion which destroyed the ship. About two thousand sailors were killed or drowned, including the admiral of the Ottoman navy, Nasuhzade Ali Pasha, who was killed by a falling spar.

According to Thomas Gordon, the burning of the Ottoman flagship in Chios was one of the most astonishing achievements in history and he declared Konstantinos Kanaris a hero that Greece could be proud of.

See also 
 Greek War of Independence
 Chios massacre
 Destruction of Psara

References

Sources 
 
 
 
 

1822 in Greece
History of Chios
Chios 1822
Conflicts in 1822